Beara  may refer to:

Beara, Jamalpur, a village Bangladesh
Beara Peninsula, Ireland
Beara GAA, a sporting organisation on the Beara Peninsula 
Beara (moth), a genus of Nolidae
Beara, Ampanihy, a rural municipality in Ampanihy Ouest (district), Madagascar

People
Ljubiša Beara (1939–2017), member of the Bosnian Serb Army
Vladimir Beara (1928–2014), Yugoslav footballer